Miklós Villányi (born March 5, 1931) is a former Hungarian politician, who served as Minister of Finance between 1987 and 1989.

References
 Rulers.org

1931 births
Living people
Members of the Hungarian Socialist Workers' Party
Finance ministers of Hungary